The 2018–19 Egypt Cup was the 87th edition of the oldest recognised football tournament in Africa. It is sponsored by WE, and known as the WE Cup for sponsorship purposes. It started with the First Preliminary Round on 12 August 2018, and concluded with the final on 8 September 2019.

Egyptian Premier League side Zamalek successfully defended their title and defeated Pyramids 3–0 in the final.

Teams

Round and draw dates
The schedule is as follows.

Format

Participation
The Egypt Cup began with a round of 32 teams. The 18 teams of the Egyptian Premier League, along with the 14 winning teams qualified from the Fifth Preliminary Round of the 2018–19 Egypt Cup qualifying rounds.

Draw
The draw for the main competition was held at the Egyptian Football Association headquarters in Gezira, Cairo on 4 October 2018 and was broadcast live on ON Sport.

For the first round, the participating teams were split into three pots, the first one contained the three promoted teams from the Egyptian Second Division and the fifteenth placed team in the Egyptian Premier League, the second one contained the other 14 teams of the Egyptian Premier League and the last one contained the 14 teams qualified from the Fifth Preliminary Round.

The draw rules are as follow:
 The defending champions (Zamalek) and the Egyptian Premier League champions (Al Ahly) are placed in different paths, and can face each other only in the final.
 The Egyptian Premier League runners-up and third placed team (Ismaily and Al Masry) are placed in different paths, and can face each other only in the final.
 The three promoted teams from the Egyptian Second Division (El Gouna, Nogoom and Haras El Hodoud) alongside the fifteenth placed team in the Egyptian Premier League (Wadi Degla) are drawn against each other in the first round.

Match rules
Teams meet in one game per round. Matches take place for 90 minutes, with two-halves of 45 minutes. If still tied after regulation, 30 minutes of extra time will be played, consisting of two periods of 15 minutes. If the score is still level after this, the match will be decided by a penalty shoot-out. A coin toss will decide who takes the first penalty. A total of seven players are allowed to be listed on the substitute bench, with up to three substitutions being allowed during regulation.

Champion qualification
Usually, the winner of the Egypt Cup earns automatic qualification for the 2019–20 CAF Confederation Cup. If they have already qualified for the CAF Confederation Cup or CAF Champions League through their position in the Egyptian Premier League, then the spot will go to the cup runners-up. If the cup runners-up also qualified for an African competition through their league position, then the spot will be given to the fourth placed team in the league.

However, since the competition will conclude in September 2019 and the 2019–20 CAF Confederation Cup began in August 2019, the winner of this season's edition of the competition won't earn qualification for the CAF Confederation Cup, and the spot awarded to the cup winner was given to the fourth placed team in the 2018–19 Egyptian Premier League.

Qualifying rounds

All of the competing teams that are not members of the Egyptian Premier League had to compete in the qualifying rounds to secure one of 14 available places in the Round of 32. The qualifying competition began with the First Preliminary Round on 12 August 2018. The final (fifth) qualifying round was played on 3 October 2018.

Round of 32
The matches were played from 8 October to 2 December 2018. This round included four teams from the Egyptian Third Division, Ittihad El Shorta, MS Minyat Samanoud, Muslim Youths (Qena) and Naser El Fekreia, the lowest ranking sides left in the competition.

All times are CAT (UTC+2).

Round of 16
The matches were played from 23 October 2018 to 17 August 2019. This round included two teams from the Egyptian Second Division, Al Jazeera and El Mansoura, the lowest ranking sides left in the competition.

All times are CAT (UTC+2).

Quarter-finals
The matches were played from 3 January to 30 August 2019.

All times are CAT (UTC+2).

Semi-finals
The matches were played on 1 and 2 September 2019.

All times are CAT (UTC+2).

Final

Bracket
The following is the bracket which the Egypt Cup resembled. Numbers in parentheses next to the match score represent the results of a penalty shoot-out.

Top goalscorers
The following are the top scorers of the Egypt Cup, sorted first by number of goals, and then alphabetically if necessary. Goals scored in penalty shoot-outs are not included.

References

Notes

 
Egypt Cup
Egypt